The squamate antbird (Myrmoderus squamosus) is a species of bird in the family Thamnophilidae. It is endemic to Brazil.
Its natural habitats are subtropical or tropical moist lowland forest and subtropical or tropical moist montane forest.

The squamate antbird was described by the Austrian ornithologist August von Pelzeln in 1868 and given the binomial name Myrmeciza squamosa. A molecular phylogenetic study published in 2013 found that Myrmeciza was polyphyletic. In the resulting rearrangement to create monotypic genera four species including the squamate antbird were moved to the resurrected genus Myrmoderus.

References

Myrmoderus
Birds of the Atlantic Forest
Endemic birds of Brazil
Birds described in 1868
Taxonomy articles created by Polbot